The Battle of Mexico City may refer to:

Warfare
 Fall of Tenochtitlan (1521) the conquest of the Aztec City preceding the Spanish renaming
 Battle for Mexico City (1847)
 Capture of Mexico City (1863)
 Siege of Mexico City (1867)

Other uses
 The Battle of Mexico City (2001 video album) concert film for 1999 concert in Mexico City by Rage Against the Machine

See also
 Timeline of Mexico City
 Mexico City (disambiguation)